Harold Joseph Kushner is an American applied mathematician and a Professor Emeritus of Applied Mathematics at Brown University. He is known for his work on the theory of stochastic stability (based on the concept of supermartingales as Lyapunov functions), the theory of non-linear filtering (based on the Kushner equation), and for the development of numerical methods for stochastic control problems such as the Markov chain approximation method. He is commonly cited as the first person to study Bayesian optimization, based on work he published in 1964.

Harold Kushner received his Ph.D. in Electrical Engineering from the University of Wisconsin in 1958.

Awards and honors
 In 1992 the IEEE Control Systems Award
 In 1994 the Louis E. Levy Medal from The Franklin Institute
 In 2004 the Richard E. Bellman Control Heritage Award from the American Automatic Control Council, for "fundamental contributions to stochastic systems theory and engineering applications, and for inspiring generations of researchers in the field"

Bibliography

References

External links
 Brown University profile
 AACC profile

Control theorists
Richard E. Bellman Control Heritage Award recipients
Living people
Fellows of the Society for Industrial and Applied Mathematics
Brown University faculty
University of Wisconsin–Madison College of Engineering alumni
Year of birth missing (living people)